Albert Frederick Macdonald (June 13, 1901 – August 20, 1976) was a railway employee, worked as a cashier and served as a Canadian federal politician.

Macdonald ran for the House of Commons of Canada as a candidate for the Liberal Party in the 1949 federal election. He defeated incumbent Member of Parliament Patrick Ashby to win the Edmonton East electoral district. Macdonald served one term in office before being defeated by Ambrose Holowach in the 1953 federal election.

References

External links
 

1901 births
1976 deaths
Politicians from Winnipeg
Members of the House of Commons of Canada from Alberta
Liberal Party of Canada MPs